Elyzabeth Pham is a Vietnamese-American beauty queen from Madison, Wisconsin who competed in the Miss USA Pageant.

In late 1998, Pham was crowned Miss Wisconsin USA 1999, the first titleholder of Asian descent. She competed in the nationally televised Miss USA Pageant, where she was the first Vietnamese-American to complete in the Miss USA Pageant, and subsequently  became the first delegate from Wisconsin to win the Miss Photogenic Award. The pageant was won by Kimberly Pressler, Miss New York USA.

Pham obtained a Bachelor of Arts in English literature from the University of California, San Diego. She speaks four languages and signs.

Notes

External links
Elyzabeth Pham website

Miss USA 1999 delegates
American people of Vietnamese descent
Living people
People from Madison, Wisconsin
Miss Photogenic at Miss USA
University of California, San Diego alumni
Year of birth missing (living people)
20th-century American people